The Ballantyne Strait is a natural waterway through the central Canadian Arctic Archipelago in the Northwest Territories of Canada. It separates Prince Patrick Island (to the south-west) and Brock Island (to the north-east).  It opens into the Arctic Ocean to the north-west.

References

 
Straits of the Northwest Territories